Ming is a Chinese given name. Notable people with the name include:

 Ming Chen (born 1974), Taiwanese American actor
 Ming Chin (born 1942), American jurist of Chinese descent
 Fu Ming (born 1983), Chinese football referee
 Gao Ming (c. 1305–1370), Chinese poet and playwright
 
 
 Ming C. Lin, Taiwanese American computer scientist
 Ju Ming (born 1938), Taiwanese sculptor
 Ming Sen Shiue (born 1950), Taiwanese-American murderer, kidnapper, and rapist 
 Ming Tsai (born 1964), celebrity chef
 Xi Ming (born 1989), Chinese model
 Xu Ming (1971–2015), Chinese entrepreneur
 Xu Ming (figure skater) (born 1981), Chinese figure skater
 Xue Ming (born 1987), Chinese volleyball player
 Yao Ming (born 1980), Chinese basketball player
 
 

Chinese given names